The 2016 FIBA 3x3 World Championships was held in Guangzhou, China, and was contested by 20 teams.

Participating teams
All five FIBA zones were represented. The top 20 teams, including the hosts, based on the FIBA National Federation ranking qualified for the tournament.

Preliminary round

Pool A

Pool B

Pool C

Pool D

Knockout stage

Final standings

Awards

Individual awards
Most Valuable Player
 Dušan Bulut (SRB)
Team of the Tournament
 Dušan Bulut (SRB)
 Myke Henry (USA)
 Gašper Ovnik (SLO)
Dunk Contest Champion
  Dmytro Krivenko (UKR)

References

External links
Official website

Men
2016 in men's sport
FIBA 3x3 World Championships
FIBA 3x3 World Championships
FIBA 3x3 World Championships